James Gilligan is an American psychiatrist and author, husband of Carol Gilligan and best known for his series of books entitled Violence, where he draws on 25 years of work in the American prison system to describe the motivation and causes behind violent behavior.

During his career, Gilligan has served as director for the Bridgewater State Hospital for the criminally insane, director of mental health for the Massachusetts prison system and as president of the International Association for Forensic Psychotherapy. He now lectures at the Department of Psychiatry, New York University. Gilligan is an adjunct professor at NYU Law and collegiate professor at NYU's College of Arts and Sciences. He has been on the faculty at NYU since 2002.

Previously, Gilligan was a faculty member at Harvard Medical School, where he worked from 1966 to 2000. In 1977 he became the director of the Harvard Institute of Law and Psychiatry.

Gilligan was brought in as the medical director of the Massachusetts prison mental hospital in Bridgewater, Massachusetts because of the high suicide and murder rates within their prisons. When he left ten years later the rates of both had dropped to nearly zero.

Gilligan served as the psychiatric adviser to Martin Scorsese for the film, Shutter Island.

Books authored
Violence - Our Deadly Epidemic and Its Causes – 1996 
Violence - Reflections on a National Epidemic – 1997
Violence - Reflections on Our Deadliest Epidemic – 1999
Violence - Reflections on a Western Epidemic – 2000
Violence in California Prisons: A Proposal for Research into Patterns and Cures – 2000
Preventing Violence – 2001
Why Some Politicians Are More Dangerous to Your Health Than Others – 2011

References

Further reading
An Interview with James Gilligan, MD (Psychotherapy.net) James Gilligan Interview: Working with Violent Offenders in Prison Settings

Year of birth missing (living people)
Place of birth missing (living people)
Living people
New York University faculty
Harvard Medical School faculty
Harvard College alumni
Case Western Reserve University School of Medicine alumni
American forensic psychiatrists